Sebastián Salvat (born 5 April 1967 in Buenos Aires) is a former Argentine rugby union player. Recognized in the world of rugby as a talented and resourceful back, that played for more than 20 years at Club, National and International levels, mostly as fullback and centre. In addition,  he developed his professional career as an architect and planner, and is currently working as VP of Development / Head of Design at Fortune International Group, a fully integrated Real Estate company in Miami.

Salvat was an emblematic player for Asociación Alumni. He played for Alumni's first team between 1986 and 1996, obtaining the Championship of Buenos Aires in a record four consecutive winning streak. (1989-1990-1991-1992).

He's also been a valuable player representing his province Buenos Aires, winning the Argentine Championship in 1995 and obtaining historic wins against the Springboks (1993) and France (1996).

Sebastian Salvat was South American Champion first as a junior playing for Pumitas in 1986, and later on his career with Pumas in 1991, 1993 and 1995.

He played 37 caps for Argentina, between 1987 and 1995, scoring 12 tries, 58 points in aggregate. His first game and international debut playing for Los Pumas was at the 38-3 win over Uruguay, at 3 May 1987, in Montevideo, for the South American Rugby Championship. He was the captain in his ultimate 13 caps.

At age 20, Salvat was selected for the 1987 Rugby World Cup Argentine squad, playing two games in a competition where the Pumas were knocked out in the 1st round, winning only their game against Italy. He missed the 1991 Rugby World Cup, but returned for the 1995 Rugby World Cup, as the team captain. He played in all three games, but Argentina once again couldn't make it to the  quarterfinals. 

Salvat played his last match for Pumas in October 21st 1995 at the 45-12 loss against France, for the final of the Latin Cup played in Buenos Aires, aged only 28 years old.

The most relevant test-matches played along his 10 years of International career were against the All Blacks (1989), the Springboks (1993-1994), Australia (1995), England (1991-1995) and France (1988, 1992 and 1995).

In 1995 Sebastian Salvat was honored as Caballero del Rugby in recognition for his sportsmanship throughout his career. In 1996 he was invited to play for the British Barbarians along other international players,  Agustin Pichot (Argentina), Dennis Charvet (France) and John Gallagher (NZ).

References

External links

1967 births
Living people
Argentine rugby union players
Argentina international rugby union players
Rugby union fullbacks
Rugby union centres
Rugby union players from Buenos Aires
Asociación Alumni players